There are many $500 banknotes, bills or coins, including:

 Nicaraguan five hundred-cordoba note
 One of the withdrawn Canadian banknotes
 One of the withdrawn large denominations of United States currency
 One of the banknotes of the Hong Kong dollar
 One of the banknotes of Zimbabwe

Other currencies that issue $500 banknotes, bills or coins are: